The NWA World Midget's Championship was the National Wrestling Alliance's midget wrestling singles championship. Large parts of the championship history is undocumented due to lack of documentation of Midget wrestling for large periods of time from the 1950s to the 1980s. In that period of time, there were two touring groups of midget wrestlers in the United States, both had a "World Champion", leading to some uncertainty as to who was the NWA World Midget's Champion, often based on if the champion was booked as defending the championship in an NWA territory. The first wrestler to lay claim to the Midget's World Championship was Sky Low Low after he won a 30-man tournament in Paris, France. The tournament was either fictitious or not an NWA sanctioned event as it took place in Europe. But at some point after 1949 the NWA recognized Sky Low Low as their champion.

It is impossible to determine who held the championship the longest, but it is plausible that Farmer Pete's 7 day title reign in 1957 was the shortest of all the reigns. Lord Littlebrook and Little Tokyo are both credited with three championship reigns, but due to incomplete records it is possible that either had more reigns or someone else had more than three reigns in total. Because the championship was a professional wrestling championship, it was not won or lost competitively but instead by the decision of the bookers of a wrestling promotion. The championship was awarded after the chosen team "won" a match to maintain the illusion that professional wrestling is a competitive sport.

Title history
Key

See also
NWL Midget Championship
WCPW Midget Championship
Mini-Estrella

Footnotes

References

National Wrestling Alliance championships
Midget wrestling championships